Homocysteic acid is a sulfur-containing glutamic acid analog and a potent NMDA receptor agonist. It is related to homocysteine, a by-product of methionine metabolism.

References

Amino acids
Sulfonic acids